Greenland is an unincorporated community between Walker's Ridge and New Creek Mountain on the North Fork Patterson Creek in Grant County, West Virginia, United States. Greenland lies at the western end of Greenland Gap in New Creek Mountain.

The community most likely was named for their green land at and around the original town site.

Notable people
Notable people that were born or lived in Greenland include:
Quinn McNemar (1901–1986), psychologist and statistician

References

Unincorporated communities in Grant County, West Virginia
Unincorporated communities in West Virginia